Myles (or Miles) Byrne (20 March 1780 – 24 January 1862) was an insurgent leader in Wexford in the Irish Rebellion of 1798 and a fighter in the continued guerrilla struggle against British Crown forces in the Wicklow Hills until 1802. In 1803 collaborated closely with Robert Emmet in plans for a renewed insurrection in Dublin. After these misfired, he took a commission in Napoleon’s Irish Legion, seeing action in the Low Countries, Spain and at the Battle of Leipzig. Under the Bourbon Restoration he was deployed to Greece, and retired as a chef de bataillon. In his later years, he was the Paris correspondent for the Young Irelander paper The Nation, and dictated his memoirs. In these he advanced the image of the United Irishmen as a cohesive revolutionary organisation dedicated to the achievement of a national democratic government.

Early life

Myles (he usually spelled his name Miles) Byrne was born in the townland of Ballylusk near Monaseed, County Wexford, Ireland, on 20 March 1780, into a Catholic farming family.

1798 Rebellion

At the age of 17 Byrne was asked to join the government Yeomanry. He choose instead to join the Society of United Irish. In defiance of the British Crown and the Protestant Ascendancy the oath-bound movement was determined to achieve an independent and representative government for Ireland. He participated in preparations in Wexford for the 1798 Rebellion, and at the age of 18 fought at the Battle of Tubberneeing on 4 June and, in command of a division of pikemen, in the attack on Arklow (9 June) in which the rebel leader Father Michael Murphy was killed. In the face of a general rout, he led a rebel charge in the Battle of Vinegar Hill (21 June).

Keeping command of a small band, Byrne seized Goresbridge (23 June) but had to deplore the murder of several prisoners and other atrocities committed by his men in revenge for the torture and executions that had been visited upon the peasantry by the yeomanry and government militia. After further skirmishes he joined Joseph Holt and Michael Dwyer in taking to the Wicklow Hills to continue a guerrilla resistance.

After Holt accepted terms (transportation to Australia) in November, Byrne, assisted by his sister, escaped to Dublin. He recalled of his sister: “If I had not remarked a long scar on her neck, she would not have mentioned anything herself. A yeoman ... threatened to cut her throat with his sabre if she did not tell instantly the place in which I was hiding. The cowardly villain, no doubt, would have put his threat in execution had not some of his comrades interfered to prevent him".

Rising of 1803

In the winter of 1802-03 Byrne entered into the plans of Robert Emmet and Anne Devlin for a renewed uprising. In his Memoirs Byrne describes a meeting he arranged between Robert Emmet and the Wexford rebel leader Thomas Cloney at Harold's Cross Green, Dublin, just prior to Emmet's Rebellion: "I can never forget the impression this meeting made on me at the time - to see two heroic patriots, equally devoted to poor Ireland, discussing the best means of obtaining her freedom."

In July 1803, the plans unravelled when Michael Dwyer (Devlin's cousin), still holding out in Wicklow, recognised that there were neither the promised arms nor convincing proof of an intended French landing. In the north Thomas Russell and James Hope found no enthusiasm for a renewal of the struggle in what in '98 had been the strongest United Irish and Catholic Defender districts.

In Dublin, with their preparations revealed by an accidental explosion of a rebel arms depot, Emmet proceeded with a plan to seize the centres of government. The rising, for which for Byrne turned out with Emmet and Malachy Delaney in gold-trimmed green uniforms, was broken up after a brief confrontation in Thomas Street. Unaware that John Allen was approaching with a band, according to one witness, of 300, Emmet ordered what R.R. Madden recorded as "a motley assemblage of [80] armed men ... under the evident excitement of drink" to disperse.

In the service of France
Two days after the fight in Thomas Street, Byrne met with the fugitive Emmet and agreed to go to Paris to procure French assistance. But in Paris he found Napoleon's attentions (as in 1798) focussed elsewhere. The First Consul used a cessation of hostilities with Britain to pursue a very different venture, the re-enslavement of Haiti.

Byrne was commissioned as a captain in Napoleon's Irish Legion. But at a time when Byrne was convinced that "all Catholic Ireland" was "ready to rise the moment a rallying point was offered", the Irish exiles (Thomas Addis Emmet and Arthur O'Connor chief among them) could not deflect the First Consul from other priorities. Rather than in Ireland, with his diminishing Irish contingent, Byrne was to see action in the Low Countries, Germany and Spain.

Byrne rose to the rank of brigadier general and was awarded the Legion of Honour in 1813. Following the Bourbon Restoration, with fellow legionnaire John Allen, Byrne narrowly avoided deportation as a foreign Bonapartist. An introduction to the Prince de Broglie, then vice-president of the Chamber of Deputies and two audiences with the Minister of War, Marshal Henri Clarke, the Duke of Feltre, (a son of Irish parents, who had advised Wolfe Tone) contributed to the latter's decision to quash the deportation order. In August 1817 Byrne was naturalised as a French citizen.

For much of the next decade Byrne found himself effectively retired on half pay.  Returned to active military service in 1828, he distinguished himself in the French expedition to Morea (as did his fellow United Irishman, William Corbet) during the Greek War of Independence. He retired in 1835 with the rank of Chef de Bataillion.

Memoirs
In the 1840s, Byrne was Paris correspondent for The Nation in Dublin, the Young Irelander paper that under the early direction of Thomas David did much to rehabilitate the memory of the United Irishmen.

In his last years Byrne wrote his Memoirs, which are an account of his participation in the Irish rebellion and his time in the Irish Legion of Napoleon. These were first published in three volumes in 1863 (under the direction of his widow, Fanny), but there have been many subsequent reprints.

Stephen Gwynn who edited and published a new edition of Byrne’s Memoirs in 1907, stated in his Introduction to Volume 1: “I owe my acquaintance with these Memoirs to Mr John Dillon, who spoke of them as the best of all books dealing with Ireland; and a reading of the volumes left me inclined to agree with him.”

Against the portrayal of '98 as a series of disjointed, unconnected risings, Byrne's memoirs presented the United Irishmen as a cohesive revolutionary organisation whose aim of a democratic, secular, republic had captured the allegiance of a great mass of the Irish people.

Marriage

Byrne was married (1835) in Paris to a Scots Presbyterian, Frances Charles Horner (better known as Fanny), (1789 - 1876) (originally from George Square, Edinburgh, Scotland) but they had no children. Fanny's father was John Horner, a "merchant of Edinburgh", and her mother was Joanna Baillie. They were married on Christmas Eve, 24 December 1835 in the British Embassy Chapel in Paris. She had three brothers and two sisters. One of her brothers was Francis Horner (1778 - 1817), a Whig MP; another, Leonard Horner (1785 - 1864), was a noted geologist.

1859 Photograph

A photograph (above) of Byrne faces page 185 in Nicholas Furlong's "Fr John Murphy of Boolavogue: 1753-1798" (Dublin, 1991). According to the author, it was taken in Paris in 1859 and was thought to be the first photograph taken of an Irishman. That distinction is probably owed to an 1844 calotype by the pioneer photographer Henry Fox Talbot of the Irish poet (and biographer of Wolfe Tone) Thomas Moore. (In 1821 Byrne had refused to attend a St Patrick's day dinner Moore had organised in Paris because of the presence of Wellesley Pole Long, a nephew of the Duke of Wellington).

The photograph of Byrne, possibly the only one of a United Irish veteran, is now in Áras an Uachtaráin, the residence of the President of Ireland, in Dublin.

John Mitchel visited Byrne when he was 80 years old and described him as "One of those rare beings who never grow old".

Death

Miles Byrne  died at his house in the rue Montaigne (now rue Jean Mermoz, 8th arrondissement, near Champs-Élysées), Paris on Friday 24 January 1862, and was buried in Montmartre Cemetery. His grave there is marked by a Celtic Cross - but this headstone appears to be a 1950s replacement for an earlier one. The inscription to his original headstone appears in his Memoirs; in part, it read:

('Sincerely attached to Ireland, his country of birth, he faithfully served France, his country of adoption')

References

Miles Byrne (1780-1862) - Memoirs of Miles Byrne (1863).
Nicholas Furlong, "Fr. John Murphy of Boolavogue: 1753-1798" (Dublin, 1991).
Stephen Gwynn (ed.), Memoirs of Miles Byrne - edited by his Widow, 2 vols. (Dublin & London, 1907).
K. Wkelan (ed) & W. Nolan (assoc. ed.), "Wexford: History and Society" (Dublin: Geography Publications, 1987).
Leonard Horner (ed.), "Memoirs and Correspondence of Francis Horner, M.P." (Boston, 1853).

1780 births
1862 deaths
Chevaliers of the Légion d'honneur
People from County Wexford
United Irishmen
Burials at Montmartre Cemetery
Irish emigrants to France
Irish soldiers in the French Army
Military personnel of the Napoleonic Wars